Mošnov is a municipality and village in Nový Jičín District in the Moravian-Silesian Region of the Czech Republic. It has about 700 inhabitants.

History
The first written mention of Mošnov is from 1367.

Transport
The main part of Leoš Janáček Airport Ostrava, the third largest airport in the country, is located in Mošnov. It was built in 1955–1960.

References

Villages in Nový Jičín District